The CMT Association is a non-profit, global, professional organization of technical analysts headquartered in New York City, servicing over 9,000 market analysis professionals in around 80 countries. The CMT Association certifies that an individual is competent in the use of technical analysis via the Chartered Market Technician (CMT) designation.

Chartered Market Technician
As with similar finance organizations that establish standards of competence for its members, the CMT Association provides a self-developed standard of proficiency. The Chartered Market Technician program is the examination series that demonstrates proficiency in technical analysis. Candidates who pass the program's three examination levels, and who are also full members of the CMT Association, earn the Chartered Market Technician designation (CMT), certifying that the individual is competent in the use of technical analysis.

See also
 Technical analysis
 Certified Financial Technician
 List of international professional associations

References

External links
 CMT Association

Technical analysis
Business organizations based in the United States
Non-profit organizations based in New York City